"I'd Love to Change the World" is a song by the British blues rock band Ten Years After. Written by Alvin Lee, it is the lead single from the band's 1971 album A Space in Time. It is the band's only US Top 40 hit, peaking at number 40 on the Billboard Hot 100 and their most popular single in the United States.

Background and composition
The song was written and sung by Alvin Lee and features a folk-inspired chord pattern to support the melody. It discusses the confused state of the world, covering a wide variety of societal complaints, until it finally addresses the Vietnam War.

Release and reception
"I'd Love to Change the World" was the band's highest charting single. It peaked at number 40 on the Billboard Hot 100 in 1971. When it was released, "I'd Love to Change the World" was a staple of both FM and AM radio, a rarity for the time.

Billy Walker of Sounds wrote that the "acoustic guitar, echoing vocals, and electric guitar build up the tempo with very good cool electric passages by Alvin [Lee], and while there's nothing new developing it's a very nice track". Matthew Greenwald of Allmusic highlighted Lee's guitar work as the "most expressive—and most tasteful—electric guitar performance of his career", and added "if there is a single song that can describe the overall vibe of the counterculture in 1969/1970, this may very well be it. The band and Lee never quite matched the song's supple power in their later efforts, but this song is representation enough of their awesome artistry."

The song was featured in the films Tropic Thunder, The Last Supper and Minamata and was used in the episode "Six Feet" of the TBS series Wrecked and the episode "Panopticon" of the CBS series Person of Interest. It was also used in Cosmote commercials in Greece.

More recently, the song was featured in season 3/episode 7 of the British TV series BRITANNIA. 

In 2014, British singer Jetta made a cover of the song. The following year, electronic producer Matstubs released a remix of Jetta's cover. It received significant attention after being posted to the Trap Nation YouTube channel. It then hit gold, generating over 260 million plays on YouTube and 160 million on Spotify.

Personnel
Alvin Lee – guitar and vocals
Leo Lyons – bass
Ric Lee – drums
Chick Churchill – keyboards

Chart performance

Notes

References

1971 singles
Ten Years After songs
Protest songs
Songs of the Vietnam War
Columbia Records singles
Songs written by Alvin Lee
1971 songs